The Codington County Heritage Museum (formerly the Kampeska Heritage Museum) is a museum located at 27 First Avenue Southeast,  Watertown, South Dakota, in the Carnegie Free Public Library building.

The Carnegie Library was built in Watertown in 1906 through a grant from the Carnegie Foundation and functioned as a library until 1967 when operations moved to a new building further east in town next to what was then the newly built Watertown Senior High School. A youth group briefly occupied the Carnegie Library building before its use by the Codington County Historical Society.

Codington County Historical Society 
The museum is maintained by the Codington County Historical Society. The group was founded in 1970 and was officially incorporated in 1974. They put out a bi-monthly publication for paid members entitled the Codington County Courier. In the past, the publication was called Wagon Wheels.

See also 
 National Register of Historic Places listings in Codington County, South Dakota

External links 
 Official website

References 

National Register of Historic Places in Codington County, South Dakota
Museums in Codington County, South Dakota
History museums in South Dakota
Buildings and structures in Watertown, South Dakota